The Scotch Plains School, or School #1, was located in Scotch Plains, Union County, New Jersey, United States. The school was built in 1890 and was added to the National Register of Historic Places on December 12, 1978.

Originally designed by Stanford White as an elementary school, it was repurposed as a high school within ten years of its opening. School One reverted to being an elementary school in 1926 and continued as such until its closing in 1974.

The school was burned down by an arsonist in 1984. It has since been demolished.

See also 
 National Register of Historic Places listings in Union County, New Jersey

References

1890s architecture in the United States
Buildings and structures in Union County, New Jersey
National Register of Historic Places in Union County, New Jersey
Renaissance Revival architecture in New Jersey
School buildings completed in 1890
School buildings on the National Register of Historic Places in New Jersey
Scotch Plains, New Jersey
New Jersey Register of Historic Places